Bachelor Mother (1939) is an American romantic comedy film directed by Garson Kanin, and starring Ginger Rogers, David Niven, and Charles Coburn. The screenplay was written by Norman Krasna from an Academy Award-nominated story by Felix Jackson (a.k.a. Felix Joachimson) written for the 1935 Austrian-Hungarian film Little Mother. With a plot full of mistaken identities, Bachelor Mother is a light-hearted treatment of the otherwise serious issues of child abandonment.

It was remade in 1956 as Bundle of Joy, starring Debbie Reynolds and Eddie Fisher, and inspired the Bollywood film Kunwara Baap.

Plot 
Polly Parrish (Ginger Rogers) is a salesgirl at the department store John B. Merlin and Son in New York City. Hired as temporary help for the Christmas season, she receives her dismissal notice as the season comes to a close. On her way home, she sees a stranger leaving a baby on the steps of an orphanage. Fearing exposure to the cold will harm the baby, Polly fails to catch the mother and takes it inside. An attendant mistakenly believes that Polly is the baby's mother, and insists she keep it or be reported to the authorities.

David Merlin (David Niven), the playboy son of the store's owner J.B. Merlin (Charles Coburn), is sympathetic to the "unwed mother" and arranges for her to get her job back. Mrs. Weiss (Ferike Boros), Polly's landlady, offers to take care of the boy when Polly is at work. Unable to convince anyone that she is not the mother, and threatened by David with loss of her job if she doesn't assume that role, Polly gives up and starts raising the child.

David's involvement with Polly gradually turns into love, but he keeps the relationship a secret from his father, fearing his reaction. When he finds that New Year's Eve has arrived and he has no date, David turns to Polly. He orders clothes to be sent from the store and takes her to a party. Although David is falling for Polly, he does not relish the idea of a "ready-made family".

When J.B. learns about the child, he assumes that David is the father. His suspicions are reinforced when, in a bit of bad timing, Polly and David each produce a different man whom they claim is the father. To his son's surprise, J.B. is delighted (he had been impatiently waiting for David to settle down and provide him with a grandson). In the end, David decides that he is in love with Polly and baby John. He tells his father that he is the father of the child and plans to marry Polly, all the while believing Polly is the child's mother.

Cast

Production 
The film was a remake of the 1935 Hungarian film Little Mother from Joe Pasternak and Henry Koster which was never screened in the US.

In November 1938 RKO announced Little Mother would star Ginger Rogers. It would be the first film produced at the studio by Buddy de Sylva. The film replaced Perfect Honeymoon and She Married for Money in Rogers' schedule at RKO.

Louis Hayward was originally announced as the male lead. Then RKO announced Cary Grant would play the role. A few days later RKO announced Grant was replaced by James Ellison. In January 1939 RKO announced Garson Kanin, who had impressed with A Man to Remember, would direct and Norman Krasna was writing the script. A few days later the studio said the male lead was played by Douglas Fairbanks Jr. In March RKO said Fairbanks Jr would make The Sun Never Sets at Universal instead and his role would be played by David Niven who had been borrowed from Sam Goldwyn.

The film had a number of titles. RKO disliked Little Mother and the Hays Office had objections to alternatives they proposed, Bachelor Mother and Baby Trouble. Garson Kanin wanted to call it Baby Makes Three but producer Buddy De Sylva overruled him.

Reception

Box office 
The film was a big hit and earned RKO a profit of $827,000.

Adaptations to other media 
Bachelor Mother was adapted as a radio play on several occasions, including five broadcasts of The Screen Guild Theater: the first starred Laraine Day, Henry Fonda and Charles Coburn (February 1, 1942); the second starred Ann Sothern and Fred MacMurray (November 23, 1942); the third starred Ginger Rogers, Francis X. Bushman and David Niven (May 6, 1946); the fourth starred Lucille Ball, Joseph Cotten and Charles Coburn (April 28, 1949); the fifth starred Ann Sothern and Robert Stack (April 20, 1952). It was also adapted as an hour-long play on Lux Radio Theater with Ginger Rogers and Fredric March (January 22, 1940) and on Screen Director's Playhouse with Lucille Ball and Robert Cummings (March 8, 1951).

References

External links 

 
 Bachelor Mother at BFI
 
 
 
 Review of film at Variety

1939 films
1939 romantic comedy films
1930s screwball comedy films
American romantic comedy films
American screwball comedy films
American Christmas comedy films
American remakes of foreign films
American black-and-white films
1930s English-language films
Films scored by Roy Webb
Films directed by Garson Kanin
Films set in department stores
Films set in New York City
RKO Pictures films
1930s Christmas comedy films
Remakes of Austrian films
Remakes of Hungarian films
1930s American films